Carter County is a county located in the U.S. state of Montana. As of the 2020 census, the population was 1,415, making it the seventh-least populous county in Montana. The county seat is Ekalaka.

History
Carter County was named for Thomas Henry Carter, the state's first congressman (representative in Congress from the Montana Territory, followed by first representative from the state of Montana to the US House of Representatives). Prior to settlement the land of Carter County was occupied by the Sioux tribe.

Geography

Medicine Rocks State Park is located 14 miles north of Ekalaka. Weathering has given the rocks an unusual texture. The site was used by Indian hunting parties.

Adjacent counties

 Powder River County - west
 Custer County - northwest
 Fallon County - north
 Harding County, South Dakota - east
 Butte County, South Dakota - southeast
 Crook County, Wyoming - south

National protected area
 Custer National Forest (part)

Demographics

2000 census
As of the 2000 census, there were 1,360 people, 543 households, and 382 families living in the county. The population density was <1/km2 (<1/sq mi). There were 811 housing units at an average density of <1/km2 (<1/sq mi). The racial makeup of the county was 98.60% White, 0.07% Black or African American, 0.37% Native American, 0.15% Asian, 0.29% from other races, and 0.51% from two or more races. 0.59% of the population were Hispanic or Latino of any race. 35.3% were of German, 14.0% English, 12.9% Norwegian, 11.1% Irish and 5.2% Scottish ancestry.

There were 543 households, out of which 30.60% had children under the age of 18 living with them, 60.60% were married couples living together, 7.00% had a female householder with no husband present, and 29.50% were non-families. 27.10% of all households were made up of individuals, and 14.90% had someone living alone who was 65 years of age or older. The average household size was 2.47 and the average family size was 2.99.

The county population contained 26.50% under the age of 18, 4.10% from 18 to 24, 24.90% from 25 to 44, 26.50% from 45 to 64, and 17.90% who were 65 years of age or older. The median age was 42 years. For every 100 females there were 94.80 males. For every 100 females age 18 and over, there were 96.70 males.

The median income for a household in the county was $26,313, and the median income for a family was $32,262. Males had a median income of $21,466 versus $15,703 for females. The per capita income for the county was $13,280. About 15.90% of families and 18.10% of the population were below the poverty line, including 16.20% of those under age 18 and 16.40% of those age 65 or over.

2010 census
As of the 2010 census, there were 1,160 people, 532 households, and 354 families living in the county. The racial makeup of the county was 97.8% white, 0.9% American Indian, 0.1% black or African American, 0.1% Asian, 0.3% from other races, and 0.8% from two or more races. Those of Hispanic or Latino origin made up 0.7% of the population. In terms of ancestry, 41.5% were German, 19.6% were English, 18.8% were Norwegian, 12.3% were Irish, and 4.3% were American.

Of the 532 households, 20.5% had children under the age of 18 living with them, 59.4% were married couples living together, 4.3% had a female householder with no husband present, 33.5% were non-families, and 30.3% of all households were made up of individuals. The average household size was 2.16 and the average family size was 2.65. The median age was 50.2 years.

The median income for a household in the county was $35,703 and the median income for a family was $47,955. Males had a median income of $26,736 versus $18,274 for females. The per capita income for the county was $20,681. About 8.5% of families and 14.0% of the population were below the poverty line, including 20.4% of those under age 18 and 10.8% of those age 65 or over.

2020 census
As of the 2020 census, there were 1,415 people and 628 households in Carter County. Of the population, 96.7% were White, 0.2% Black or African American, 1.0% Native American, 0.1% Asian, and 1.9% two or more races. 1.1% were Hispanic. 1.0% had a different primary language to English. The county was 50.1% female, 49.9% male.

The median household income was $48,000, $6,970 below the median of Montana. 61.7% of the population aged over 16 were in the civilian labor force. 14.7% of the population were classed as living in poverty. 2.4% of the population had a disability. 92.5% of the population graduated high school, with 20.2% obtaining a bachelor's degree or higher. 86.5% of households had a computer, with 77.9% having broadband access.

Politics
Carter County has voted for the Republican candidate in every presidential election since 1952, with Harry S. Truman being the last Democrat to carry the county.

Communities

Town
 Ekalaka (county seat)

Census-designated place
 Alzada

Unincorporated communities

 Albion
 Belltower
 Boyes
 Hammond
 Mill Iron
 Ridge

Former communities
 Capitol

See also
 List of lakes in Carter County, Montana
 List of mountains in Carter County, Montana

References

External links

 CarterCountyMT.info

 
1917 establishments in Montana
Populated places established in 1917